Konga, the Wild Stallion is a 1939 American Western film directed by Sam Nelson and starring Fred Stone, Rochelle Hudson and Richard Fiske.

Plot
In this drama, a battle has to be fought between rancher Yance Calhoun and farmer Jordan Hadley protecting precious meadows. The fight begins when the rancher's horses constantly break through the farmer's fence and destroy his wheat fields. The angry farmer starts shooting at the ranch owner's horses, including the beloved wild stallion, Konga. In return, the rancher shoots the farmer to get revenge. The feud is eventually settled when the rancher's son Steve and the farmer's daughter Judith fall in love.

Cast
 Fred Stone as Yance Calhoun
 Rochelle Hudson as Judith Hadley
 Richard Fiske as Steve Calhoun
 Eddy Waller as Gloomy
 Robert Warwick as Jordan Hadley
 Don Beddoe as Fred Martin
 Carl Stockdale as Mason
 George Cleveland as Tabor
 Burr Caruth as Breckenridge

See also
 List of American films of 1939

References

External links

1939 films
1939 Western (genre) films
American Western (genre) films
Columbia Pictures films
Films directed by Sam Nelson
1930s English-language films
1930s American films